In organic chemistry, a sulfone is a organosulfur compound containing a sulfonyl functional group attached to two carbon atoms. The central hexavalent sulfur atom is double-bonded to each of two oxygen atoms and has a single bond to each of two carbon atoms, usually in two separate hydrocarbon substituents.

Synthesis and reactions

By oxidation of thioethers and sulfoxides
Sulfones are typically prepared by organic oxidation of thioethers, often referred to as sulfides. Sulfoxides are intermediates in this route. For example, dimethyl sulfide oxidizes to dimethyl sulfoxide and then to dimethyl sulfone.

From SO2

Sulfur dioxide is a convenient and widely used source of the sulfonyl functional group. Specifically, Sulfur dioxide participates in cycloaddition reactions with dienes.
The industrially useful solvent sulfolane is prepared by addition of sulfur dioxide to buta-1,3-diene followed by hydrogenation of the resulting sulfolene.

From sulfonyl and sulfuryl halides
Sulfones are prepared under conditions used for Friedel–Crafts reactions using sources of  derived from sulfonyl halides and sulfonic acid anhydrides.

Sulfones have been prepared by nucleophilic displacement of halides by sulfinates: 
ArSO2Na  +  Ar'Cl  ->  Ar(Ar')SO2  +  NaCl

Reactions
Sulfone is a relatively inert functional group, being weakly basic (compared to sulfoxides).  They are non-oxidizing.  In the Ramberg–Bäcklund reaction and the Julia olefination, sulfones are converted to alkenes by the elimination of sulfur dioxide.

Applications
Sulfolane is used to extract valuable aromatic compounds from petroleum.

Polymers
Some polymers containing sulfone groups are useful engineering plastics. They exhibit high strength and resistance to oxidation, corrosion, high temperatures, and creep under stress. For example, some are valuable as replacements for copper in domestic hot water plumbing.  Precursors to such polymers are the sulfones bisphenol S and 4,4′-dichlorodiphenyl sulfone.

Pharmacology

Examples of sulfones in pharmacology include dapsone, a drug formerly used as an antibiotic to treat leprosy, dermatitis herpetiformis, tuberculosis, or pneumocystis pneumonia (PCP). Several of its derivatives, such as promin, have similarly been studied or actually been applied in medicine, but in general sulfones are of far less prominence in pharmacology than for example the sulfonamides.

See also
Organosulfur chemistry
Sulfonanilide
Sulfoxide
Sulfonic acid (–OH substituent)

References

 
Functional groups